Alfred David Norman (5 March 1885 – 1 February 1963) was a New Zealand cricketer who played first-class cricket for Canterbury from 1908 to 1912.

Alf Norman was a left-handed opening batsman. He made his highest first-class score of 68, the highest score of the match, when Canterbury beat Wellington by 322 runs in 1910–11. He was also the leading batsman in Christchurch senior club cricket that season, with 651 runs at an average of 65.10.

References

External links
 

1885 births
1963 deaths
New Zealand cricketers
Canterbury cricketers
Cricketers from Christchurch